Harriet Jones is a fictional character in British science fiction television series Doctor Who.

Harriet Jones can also refer to:
Harriet B. Jones (1856–1943), American physician and politician in West Virginia
Harriet Jones (musician) (active since 2011), British singer and songwriter
Harriet Jones (swimmer) (born 1997), Welsh swimmer

See also 
Jeannie Mole (born Harriet Fisher Jones, 1841–1912), British socialist and trade union organizer